Latheronwheel is a small Scottish village, in Caithness. It is six kilometres (four miles) southwest of Lybster on the A9 road to Helmsdale, near the junction with the A99 road to Wick, which lies in the equally small village of Latheron.

The village is at the mouth of a wide valley, through which flows a small river called the Burn of Latheronwheel.

It was built on the land of one Captain Dunbar (who had actually wished for it to be called Janetston, after his wife). It was a planned settlement, begun in 1835 with the building of a hotel (then known as 'Dunbar's Hotel' but today as 'The Blends' - due to its proprietor in the 1890s penchant for blending whisky from stills of dubious legality). In the beginning, tenants of the settlement were allocated  and the right to fish from the harbour.

The harbour was constructed around 1840, with a small lighthouse (soon disused) built on the southern headland. At one time was the home of 50 boats although few now remain.  Initially salmon was caught, but this gave way to herring. As the herring trade became more concentrated in larger ports in the years before the First World War, the catch and the number of vessels in use in Latheronwheel declined.

The village is home to the four star Craiglea holiday complex which includes a swimming pool, something unique to this area of Scotland.

References

External links
Overview from the Gazetteer for Scotland
Photographs
Latheronwheel on Google Maps

Populated places in Caithness